Parliamentary elections were held in the People's Republic of Albania on 28 May 1950. Candidates were nominated by the Democratic Front, which was an organization subservient to the ruling Albanian Party of Labour. The Front won all 121 seats, with voter turnout reported to be 99.4%.

Results

References

Parliamentary elections in Albania
Albania
1950 in Albania
One-party elections
Albania